The Branch River is an  long river located in eastern New Hampshire in the United States. It is a tributary of the Salmon Falls River, part of the Piscataqua River watershed leading to the Atlantic Ocean.

The river begins at the outlet of Lovell Lake at Sanbornville, a village in the town of Wakefield, New Hampshire. The river turns south, paralleling New Hampshire Route 16, passes through the village of Union, and turns southeast to reach the Salmon Falls River in Northeast Pond, within the town of Milton.

A significant tributary is Jones Brook.

See also

List of rivers of New Hampshire

References

Rivers of New Hampshire
Rivers of Carroll County, New Hampshire
Rivers of Strafford County, New Hampshire